is a metro station on three lines of Osaka Metro located in Chūō-ku, Osaka, Japan.

Lines

 (M18)
 (C16)
 (Y13)
The station on the Yotsubashi Line was opened as Shinanobashi Station (信濃橋駅) in 1965, and was renamed Hommachi Station in 1969.

Layout
The station has an island platform serving two tracks for the Chūō Line on the third basement, an island platform serving two tracks for the Midōsuji Line on the second basement in the east of the platform for the Chūō Line, and two side platforms serving two tracks for the Yotsubashi Line on the first basement in the west of the platform for the Chūō Line.

"Semba-nishi (船場西)" has been shown on the station signs for the Midosuji Line and the Chuo Line since October 2011 to revive the traditional "Semba Brand" in the center of the city of Osaka. "Semba-higashi (船場東)" is shown on the station signs at adjacent Sakaisuji-Hommachi Station, but both names are not announced on the trains as they are not co-station names.

A connecting track is located between the Chuo Line and the Yotsubashi Line (completed in 2014). Morinomiya Workshop was consolidated with Midorigi Workshop in February 2016.

Midosuji Line

Chūō Line

Yotsubashi Line

Surroundings

Orix
Resona Bank, Limited.
Marubeni Osaka Branch
Yume No Machi Souzou Iinkai Co., Ltd.
Tsuruya Corporation
Kita-Mido
Minami-Mido
Utsubo Park
Semba Center Building
Nihon Ryutsu Sangyo Co., Ltd.
OSTEC Exhibition Hall
St. Regis Osaka

External links

 Hommachi Station - Midosuji Line 
 Hommachi Station - Midosuji Line 
 Hommachi Station - Chūō Line 
 Hommachi Station - Chūō Line 
 Hommachi Station - Yotsubashi Line 
 Hommachi Station - Yotsubashi Line

References

Chūō-ku, Osaka
Railway stations in Osaka
Railway stations in Japan opened in 1933
Osaka Metro stations